Moher is a townland in the civil parish of Drumreilly, barony of Tullyhaw, County Cavan, Ireland.

Geography

Moher is bounded on the south by Ardmoneen townland, on the west by Doon (Drumreilly) townland and on the east by Drumderg, Greaghnaloughry and Lannanerriagh townlands. Its chief geographical features are Bartonny Top mountain (Irish = Bharr an Tonnaigh = The Top of the Mound) which reaches a height of 411 metres, Bartonny Lough, waterfalls, forestry plantations, mountain streams, a sulphurous spa well and dug wells. Moher is traversed by minor public roads and rural lanes. The townland covers 917 statute acres.

History

The landlord of Moher in the 19th century was the Beresford Estate. A map of the Beresford estate drawn in 1831 spells the name as Moher.

The Tithe Applotment Books for 1834 list sixteen tithepayers in the townland.

Griffith's Valuation of 1857 lists twenty-two landholders in the townland.

The 1913 Ordnance Survey map reduced the area of Moher by taking some of the land adjoining on the south side which had belonged to it in the 1836 OS map and adding it to Ardmoneen townland.

Census

In the 1901 census of Ireland, there were fourteen families listed in the townland.

In the 1911 census of Ireland, there were fifteen families listed in the townland.

Antiquities

 Stone bridges over the streams
 A foot-bridge over the stream.
 Stepping-stones over the stream
 A ford over the stream
 Moher Lodge
 A lime-kiln

References

External links
The IreAtlas Townland Data Base

Townlands of County Cavan